This list deals with association football rivalries around the Americas among clubs. This includes local derbies as well as matches between teams further afield. For rivalries between international teams and club rivalries around the world, see List of association football rivalries.

Only clubs of federations which are members of CONCACAF or CONMEBOL are included.

Clubs in North, Central America and the Caribbean (CONCACAF)

Aruba
 Clasico di Aruba: Dakota vs. RCA

Bermuda
 Devonshire derby: Devonshire Colts vs. Devonshire Cougars

Canada

Canadian Classique: Toronto FC vs. CF Montréal
Trillium Cup: Toronto FC vs. Columbus Crew
Cascadia Cup: Portland Timbers vs. Seattle Sounders FC vs. Vancouver Whitecaps FC
Cavalry–Forge: Cavalry FC vs. Forge FC
Al Classico: Cavalry FC vs. FC Edmonton (no longer contested with FC Edmonton now defunct)
905 Derby: Forge FC vs. York United FC
Canadian NASL rivalry: FC Edmonton vs. Ottawa Fury (no longer contested with Ottawa Fury now defunct)
 Toronto Derby: Toronto Croatia vs. Serbian White Eagles

Costa Rica
 Clásico Nacional: Alajuelense vs. Deportivo Saprissa
 Clásico Provincial: 
Alajuelense vs. Herediano
Herediano vs. Cartaginés
 Clásico del Buen Fútbol: Deportivo Saprissa vs. Herediano
 Clásico de las Metrópolis: Deportivo Saprissa vs. Cartaginés
Clásico del Caribe: Limón vs. Santos Guapiles
Clásico de Occidente: Municipal Grecia vs. Ramonense
Clásico de los Puertos: Limón vs. Puntarenas
Derbi de la Ciudad de Alajuela: Alajuelense vs. Carmelita
Clásico del Pacífico: Guanacasteca vs Puntarenas
Clásico del la Pampa: Guanacasteca vs Liberia
Clásico Puntarenense: Puntarenas vs Jicaral

Curaçao
 E Classico di Banda Bou: CSD Barber vs. UNDEBA

Dominican Republic
El Clásico del Fútbol Dominicano: Moca FC vs. Atlético San Cristóbal

El Salvador
 Clásico Nacional: Club Deportivo FAS vs. Águila
 Clásico de Occidente: Isidro Metapán vs. FAS
 Clásico Capitalino: Atlético Marte vs. Alianza	
 Clásico Migueleño: Dragón vs. Águila
 Clásico Oriental: Luis Ángel Firpo vs. Águila
 Clásico de la Liga salvadoreña: Luis Ángel Firpo vs. FAS
 Clásico Joven: Alianza vs. Luis Ángel Firpo

Guatemala
 El Clásico Chapín: Comunicaciones vs. Municipal
 Clásico Occidente: Xelajú vs. Marquense
 Clásico Oriental: Sacachispas vs. Zacapa
 Clásico Quetzalteco: Xelajú MC vs. Deportivo Coatepeque
 Clásico del Suroccidente: Xelajú MC vs. C.D. Suchitepéquez

Haiti
 Derby National : Racing vs. Violette also known as the Port-au-Prince Derby
 Derby de Saint-Marc: Baltimore SC vs. Tempête

Honduras

Clásico Moderno: Real C.D. España vs. C.D. Olimpia
Motagua–Real España football rivalry: Real C.D. España vs. C.D. Motagua
Clásico Nacional Hondureño: C.D. Marathón vs. C.D. Olimpia
Clásico Sampedrano: Real C.D. España vs. C.D. Marathón
Honduran Superclásico: C.D. Motagua vs. C.D. Olimpia

Jamaica
 Waterhouse-Harbour View derby: Harbour View vs. Waterhouse
 Western Kingston derby: Boys' Town vs. Tivoli Gardens
 Trench Town derby: Arnett Gardens vs. Boys' Town
 Clarendon derby: Humble Lions vs. Sporting Central Academy

Mexico

 El Super Clasico: America vs. Guadalajara
 Clasico Tapatio: Guadalajara vs. Atlas
 Clásico Joven: America vs. Cruz Azul
 Rivalry between Club América vs. Tigres UANL 
 Clásico Capitalino: America vs. U.N.A.M
Clasico Tamaulipeco: Correcaminos UAT vs. C.D.S. Tampico Madero
Clasico Poblano: Puebla vs. Lobos BUAP
 El Clásico Del Sur: Puebla vs. Veracruz
 Clásico del Bajio: (every game between Irapuato, Club Celaya or Club León) 
 Clásico Regiomontano: Tigres UANL vs. Monterrey
 Clásico Universitario: U.N.A.M vs. Tigres UANL
 Clásico Mexiquense: Toluca vs. Toros Neza
 Clásico de la 57: Querétaro vs. Atlético de San Luis
 Clásico Fronterizo: Club Tijuana vs. FC Juárez 
 Clásico Lagunero: Santos Laguna vs. Alacranes de Durango
 Clásico de Orlegui: Santos Laguna vs. Atlas FC
 Clásico de Slim: Pachuca F.C. vs Club León 
 Clásico de Sinaloa: Dorados de Sinaloa vs. Mazatlán F.C. 
 Clásico Añejo: Atlante vs. Necaxa
 El Verdadero Clásico Universitario: Pumas de la UNAM vs. FC Politécnico 
 Rivalry between U.N.A.M vs. Guadalajara
 Rivalry between Cruz Azul vs. Guadalajara
 Rivalry between America vs. Toluca
 Rivalry between U.N.A.M vs. Cruz Azul

Nicaragua
Clásico Nacional: Real Estelí vs Diriangén
Clásico de las Segovias: Real Madriz vs. Deportivo Ocotal

Panama
El Clásico: Tauro F.C. vs. Plaza Amador
Clásico Interiorano: Atlético Chiriquí vs. Atlético Veragüense

Puerto Rico
 Clásico Boricua: Puerto Rico Islanders vs. River Plate Puerto Rico (Defunct)

Suriname
 Cottica Derby: Wanhattie vs. Young Rhythm
 Defensie Derby: PVV (Police) vs. SNL (Military)
 De Surinaamse Klassieker: Robinhood vs. Transvaal
 Marowijne Derby: Papatam vs. Caravan
 Meerzorgse Derby: Excelsior vs. Nishan 42
 Moengolese Derby: Notch vs. Inter Moengotapoe
 Paramaribo Derby's: Leo Victor vs. Robinhood vs. Transvaal vs. Voorwaarts vs. WBC
 Saramacca Derby's: Boskamp vs. Fortuna vs. Real Saramacca

Trinidad and Tobago
 El Classico Trinbago: San Juan Jabloteh vs. W Connection

United States

California Clásico or California Derby: LA Galaxy vs. San Jose Earthquakes
El Tráfico or Los Angeles Derby: Los Angeles FC vs. LA Galaxy
Cascadia Cup: Portland Timbers vs. Seattle Sounders FC vs. Vancouver Whitecaps FC
Portland Timbers–Seattle Sounders rivalry
 La Chanclásico: Angel City FC vs. San Diego Wave FC
Coastal Cup: Fort Lauderdale Strikers vs. Jacksonville Armada vs. Miami FC vs. Tampa Bay Rowdies
Florida Derby: Fort Lauderdale Strikers vs. Tampa Bay Rowdies
Turnpike Derby: Orlando City SC vs. Inter Miami CF
Dylan Wolpers Derby: Houston Dynamo vs. Minnesota United FC
I-95 soccer rivalries
Atlantic Cup: D.C. United vs. New York Red Bulls
 Hudson River Derby: New York City FC vs. New York Red Bulls
 East River Derby: New York City FC vs. New York Cosmos
 New York Derby: New York Cosmos vs. New York Red Bulls
Battery-Kickers: Charleston Battery vs. Richmond Kickers
Kickers–United: D.C. United vs. Richmond Kickers
Revolution–Red Bulls derby: New England Revolution vs. New York Red Bulls
Revolution–United: D.C. United vs. New England Revolution
Shertz–Gemmel Cup/Colonial Cup: D.C. United vs. Philadelphia Union
Coffee Pot Cup: D.C. United vs. Charleston Battery
I-70 Soccer Derbies
Sporting Kansas City vs. Colorado Rapids
Sporting Kansas City vs. Saint Louis FC
Sporting Kansas City vs Columbus Crew
 Sporting Kansas City vs. St. Louis City SC (from 2023)
Texas Derby: Houston Dynamo vs. FC Dallas
Hell Is Real Derby or Ohio Derby: FC Cincinnati vs. Columbus Crew
Heritage Cup: San Jose Earthquakes vs. Seattle Sounders FC
Rocky Mountain Cup: Real Salt Lake vs. Colorado Rapids
Brimstone Cup: Chicago Fire FC vs. FC Dallas
Lamar Hunt Pioneer Cup: FC Dallas vs. Columbus Crew
Trillium Cup: Toronto FC vs. Columbus Crew
SuperClasico: Chivas USA vs. LA Galaxy (defunct)

USL Rivalries
405 Derby: LA Galaxy II vs. Orange County SC
Dirty River Derby: FC Cincinnati vs. Louisville City FC (defunct)
Queen City Cup Challenge: FC Cincinnati vs. Charlotte Independence (defunct)
Southern Derby: Charleston Battery vs. Charlotte Eagles vs. Wilmington Hammerheads
Southern Harm Derby: Birmingham Legion FC vs. Memphis 901
Southwestern Showdown: Albuquerque Sol FC vs. FC Tucson
James River Cup: Hampton Roads Piranhas vs. Richmond Kickers vs. Virginia Beach Mariners
Silver State Cup: Las Vegas Lights FC vs. Reno 1868 FC (defunct)

College rivalries
Michigan–Michigan State men's soccer rivalry: Michigan Wolverines vs. Michigan State Spartans
BYU–Utah rivalry: BYU Cougars vs. Utah Utes
Milwaukee Cup: Marquette Golden Eagles vs. Milwaukee Panthers
LeWang Cup: Northern Illinois Huskies vs. Milwaukee Panthers
SEC Derby: Kentucky Wildcats vs. South Carolina Gamecocks (Men only, in the Sun Belt Conference. The "SEC" designation reflects both schools' full-time membership in the Southeastern Conference for other sports.)
Maryland–Virginia men's soccer rivalry
Blue–Green Rivalry: Cal Poly Mustangs vs UC Santa Barbara Gauchos 
Army–Navy Cup
Indiana–Notre Dame men's soccer rivalry
Saint Louis–SIU Edwardsville men's soccer rivalry
 Modern Day Hate: Georgia Southern Eagles vs, Georgia State Panthers
 Battle of Brooklyn: LIU Sharks vs. St. Francis Brooklyn Terriers
 While both schools sponsor soccer for both men and women, the "Battle of Brooklyn" name is officially used only in men's soccer. (The name is also applied to the men's and women's basketball rivalries, but not to any other sports.)

Lower league rivalries
Rust Belt Derby: Detroit City FC vs. FC Buffalo vs. AFC Cleveland.
Chicago Dębica derby: Igloopol Chicago vs. Wisłoka Chicago
New York Hellenic derby: Greek American AA vs. New York Pancyprian-Freedoms
The Wooden Shoe: Kingston Stockade FC vs. Hartford City FC

Clubs in South America (CONMEBOL)

Argentina

Bolivia
 Clásico Paceño: Club Bolívar vs. The Strongest
 Clásico Cruceño: Club Blooming vs. Oriente Petrolero
 Clásico del sur: Universitario de Sucre vs. Real Potosí
Clásico de la Villa Imperial: Real Potosí vs. Nacional Potosí
Clásico Cochabambino: C.D. Jorge Wilstermann vs. Club Aurora

Brazil

Chile

Colombia
 'Superclásico' of Colombian Football: Atlético Nacional vs. Millonarios
 Rivalry amongst América de Cali and Atlético Nacional
 Rivalry amongst América de Cali and Millonarios
 Clásico añejo: Deportivo Cali vs. Millonarios
 Clásico Vallecaucano: América de Cali vs. Deportivo Cali, alternatively called "Clasico de San Fernando" or "Cali Derby".
 Clásico Capitalino: Millonarios vs. Santa Fe
 Clásico Antioqueño: Atlético Nacional vs. Independiente Medellín, or "Clásico Paisa"
Clásico Costeño: Junior vs. Unión Magdalena vs. Real Cartagena
Clásico Cafetero: Once Caldas vs. Deportivo Pereira vs. Deportes Quindío
 Clásico Santandereano: Cúcuta Deportivo vs. Atlético Bucaramanga, alternatively called "Clasico del Oriente”

Ecuador
Clásico del Astillero: Barcelona vs. Emelec
Clásico Capitalino: LDU Quito vs. Deportivo Quito
Superclásico de Quito: Aucas vs. LDU Quito
Clásico del Austro: Deportivo Cuenca vs.Liga de Loja
 Clásico Cuencano:  Deportivo Cuenca vs. L.D.U. Cuenca
 Superclásico Esmeraldeño: C.S.D. Juventus vs. Esmeraldas Petrolero
Clásico Manabita: LDU Portoviejo vs. Delfín SC
Clásico del Pueblo: Aucas vs. Deportivo Quito
Clásico Ambateño: Macará vs. Técnico Universitario
Clásico Universitario: Liga de Quito vs. Universidad Católica

Paraguay
 Superclásico: Olimpia vs. Cerro Porteño
 Clásico más añejo: Olimpia vs. Guaraní
Black and White derby: Olimpia vs. Libertad
 Clásico del Asunción: Cerro Porteño vs. Libertad
Clásico del barrio Trinidad: Club Rubio Ñu vs. Sportivo Trinidense
 Clásico Metropolitano: Sportivo Luqueño vs. Sportivo San Lorenzo
 Clásico de Barrio Obrero: Cerro Porteño vs. Nacional Asunción
 Clásico de Campo Grande: Cerro Corá vs. Independiente de Campo Grande (defunct)
 Clásico de barrio Jara: Sportivo Ameliano vs. Club Tacuary
 Clásico de Zeballos Cué: Tacuary vs. General Caballero
 Clásico del barrio Ricardo Brugada o del "Bajo": Oriental vs. Resistencia
 Clásico del Este: 3 de Febrero vs. Cerro de Franco.
 Clásico Capiateño: Martín Ledesma vs. 2 de Febrero.
 Clásico de Itá: Olimpia Itá vs Sportivo Iteño.
 Clásico de Itauguá: 12 de Octubre Itauguá vs. Olimpia de Itauguá
 Clásico de vecinos: Martín Ledesma vs. 12 de Octubre Itauguá
 Clásico de Luque: General Díaz vs. 29 de Setiembre
 Clásico de Ñemby: Cristobal Colón vs. Fulgencio Yegros.

Peru
 Superclásico: Alianza Lima vs. Universitario
 Clásico Universitario - Cristal: Sporting Cristal vs. Universitario
 Clásico Alianza - Cristal: Sporting Cristal vs. Alianza Lima
 Modern Classic: Deportivo Municipal vs. Universitario
 Clásicos Callao - Lima: Sport Boys vs. Alianza Lima, Deportivo Municipal, Sporting Cristal, Universitario
 Clásico Chalaco or Clásico Porteño: Sport Boys vs. Atlético Chalaco
 Clásico del Norte: Juan Aurich vs. CDU César Vallejo vs. Carlos A. Mannucci vs. Atlético Torino vs. Atlético Grau
 Clásico del Sur: FBC Melgar vs. Cienciano
 Clásico Arequipeño: FBC Melgar vs. FBC Aurora can also include FBC Piérola, Sportivo Huracán and FBC White Star 
 Clásico Cuzqueño: Cienciano vs. Deportivo Garcilaso can also include either against Cusco FC
 Clásico Huanuqueño: Alianza Universidad vs. León de Huánuco
 Clásico Puneño: Alfonso Ugarte vs. Unión Carolina can also include either against Deportivo Binacional
 Clásico Yanacanchino: Columna Pasco vs. Alipio Ponce

Uruguay
 Clásico del fútbol uruguayo: Nacional v Peñarol
 Clásico de los Medianos: Danubio v Defensor Sporting
 Clásico del Prado: River Plate v Wanderers v Bella Vista
 Clásico de la Villa: Cerro v Rampla Juniors
 Clásico del Cerrito: Club Sportivo Cerrito v Rentistas
 Clásico del Norte: Tacuarembó F.C. v Cerro Largo F.C.
 Clásico del Oeste: Fénix v Racing Club
 Clásico entre Cerro y los grandes: Cerro v Nacional or Peñarol

Venezuela
 Clasico Moderno: Caracas FC vs. Deportivo Táchira
 Clasico Viejo: C.S. Marítimo de Venezuela vs. Deportivo Táchira
 Clásico de Los Andes: Estudiantes de Mérida vs. Deportivo Táchira
 Clásico de la Autopista / del centro: Carabobo F.C. vs. Aragua F.C.
 Clásico añejo del fútbol venezolano: Estudiantes de Mérida vs. Portuguesa F.C.
 Clásico caraqueño / capitolano: Caracas F.C. vs. Petare F.C.
 Clásico del sur venezolano: Mineros de Guayana vs. Minervén S.C.
 Clásico occidental: Deportivo Lara vs. Yaracuyanos F.C.
 Clásico oriental: Mineros de Guayana vs. Monagas S.C.
 Clásico portugueseño: Llaneros de Guanare vs. Portuguesa F.C.
 Clásico rojinegro: Deportivo Lara vs. Portuguesa F.C.
 Derbi Zuliano: Zulia FC vs. Deportivo JBL del Zulia

References

External links
 FootballDerbies.com
 FIFA.com
 EuroRivals.net – fixtures, results and videos of football derbies
 50 Greatest Rivalries in World Football – Bleacher Report

Americas
Rivalries
Rivalries
Rivalries